Zouafques is a commune in the Pas-de-Calais department in the Hauts-de-France region of France.

Geography
Zouafques is located 11 miles (18 km) northwest of Saint-Omer, at the D217 road junction with the A26 autoroute, in the valley of the small river Hem.

Population

Places of interest
 The church of St.Martin, dating from the nineteenth century.
 A watermill.
 An eighteenth century dovecote.

See also
Communes of the Pas-de-Calais department

References

External links

 Official website

Communes of Pas-de-Calais